The Best of the Private Years is an album by American blues artist Taj Mahal, which was released in 2000. AllMusic's verdict on the collection was " Mahal has a rich history, and this collection is living proof that a good bluesman gets better with age".

Track listing
 "Blues Ain't Nothin'"
 "Here In The Dark"
 "Mind Your Own Business"
 "Lovin' In My Baby's Eyes"
 "Senor Blues"
 "Ooh Poo Pah Doo" (Jessie Hill)
 "Hoochi Coochi Coo"
 "Mr Pitiful"
 "I Need Your Loving"
 "I'm Ready"
 "Sophisticated Mama"
 "Mockingbird"
 "That's How Strong My Love Is"

References

2000 greatest hits albums
Taj Mahal (musician) compilation albums